The fifteenth series of Warsaw Shore, a Polish television programme based in Warsaw, Poland was announced in February 2021 and began airing on 28 March 2021. The photos were taken in Warsaw, in compliance with all safety rules related to the COVID-19 pandemic. This is the first series not to include Ewelina Kubiak, Piotr Polak, Joanna Bałdys, Daniel "Arnold" Jabłoński, Paulina Karbowiak and Michał Eliszer after their departures the previous season. It will also be the first series to include six new cast members Oliwia Dziatkiewicz, Jeremiasz "Jez" Szmigiel, Lena Majewska, Dominik Raczkowski, Patrycja Morkowska and Kamil Jagielski. The series also featured the brief return of three former cast members Piotr Polak, Alan Kwieciński and Michał Eliszer. This was the final series to include cast members Damian "Dzik" Graf, Ewa Piekut, Kinga Gondorowicz, and Maciek Szczukiewicz.

Cast 
 Alan Kwieciński (Episode 8–12)
 Damian "Dzik" Graf (Episode 1–8)
 Radosław "Diva" Majchrowski
 Dominik Raczkowski (Episode 1–8)
 Ewa Piekut
 Jeremiasz "Jez" Szmigiel
 Kamil Jagielski
 Kasjusz "Don Kasjo" Życiński
 Kinga Gondorowicz
 Lena Majewska
 Maciek Szczukiewicz
 Michał Eliszer (Episode 10–12)
 Milena Łaszek
 Oliwia Dziatkiewicz
 Patrycja Morkowska
 Patryk Spiker
 Piotr Polak (Episode 7–8)

Duration of cast

Notes 

 Key:  = "Cast member" is featured in this episode.
 Key:  = "Cast member" arrives in the house.
 Key:  = "Cast member" returns to the house.
 Key:  = "Cast member" leaves the series.
 Key:  = "Cast member" returns to the series.
 Key:  = "Cast member" is removed from the series.
 Key:  = "Cast member" does not feature in this episode.

Episodes

Controversy 
On the second episode that aired April 4, 2021, cast member Maciek was shown as he masturbated next to Oliwia when she slept. This happened after she refused to have sex earlier. After being accused of sexual violence on social media, ViacomCBS Poland removed the scene shown. In addition, the episode was edited on the streaming platform Player where it had previously been published.

References

2021 Polish television seasons
Series 15